Patanga may refer to:
 Patanga (1971 film), an Indian Hindi-language drama film
 Patanga (1949 film), an Indian Hindi-language romantic comedy film
 Patanga (grasshopper), a genus of grasshoppers in the subfamily Cyrtacanthacridinae
 Patanga (Penrhyn), an islet in Penrhyn Atoll, Cook Islands
 Patanga, a fictional city in the novel [[The Wizard of Lemuria